The Quba Khanate (also spelled Qobbeh) was one of the most significant semi-independent khanates that existed from 1747 to 1806, under Iranian suzerainty. It bordered Caspian sea to the east, Derbent Khanate to the north, Shaki Khanate to the west, and Baku and Shirvan Khanates to the south. In 1755 the khanate conquered Salyan from the Karabakh Khanate.

History 
The khans of Quba were from the Qeytaq tribe, which was divided into two branches, the Majales and the Yengikend. The origin of the tribe is obscure. First attested in the 9th-century, only their chieftain and his family were Muslims, according to the historian al-Masudi (died 956). The chieftain bore the Turkic title of Salifan, as well as the title of Kheydaqan-shah. According to the 17th-century Ottoman historian, Evliya Çelebi (died 1682), the Qeytaq spoke Mongolian, but this was dismissed as a "hoax" by the Iranologist Vladimir Minorsky (died 1966), who demonstrated that Çelebi copied the alleged Mongolian speech of the Qeytab from the texts of Hamdallah Mustawfi (died after 1339/40). The German historian and orientalist, Josef Markwart (died 1930), quoting from a earlier source, refers to the chieftain as Adharnarse. The khans of Quba were descended from Hosein Khan of the Majales branch, who was given the governorship of Saleyan and Quba by Shah Soleiman in the second half of the 1680s.

The khanate achieved its greatest prominence under Fath-Ali Khan, whose governorship lasted from 1758 to 1789. He seized Derbent, and divided Shirvan with Hosein Khan of Shaki.

After Fath Ali Khan's death, the khanate's influence declined. As a result of Mohammad Khan Qajar's conquests and the devastation it had brought, the Alliance of Northern khanates disintegrated. The khanate was conquered by Russia in 1806, and was fully incorporated into newly created Shamakha Governorate by 1846.

Population 
The Quba Khanate was mainly populated by Tatars (later known as Azerbaijanis) and Tats. It was also populated by Armenians, Lezgins and Mountain Jews.

Khans 
The khans of the Quba khanate were the following;
 1747 – 1758 - Hossein-Ali Khan
 1758 – 1789 - Fath-Ali Khan
 1789 – 1791 - Ahmad Khan
 1791 – 1806 - Shaykh Ali Khan

See also
Khanates of the Caucasus
Russian conquest of the Caucasus

References

Sources 
 
 
  
 
 

 
States and territories established in 1747
States and territories disestablished in 1806
History of Tats